Coshocton High School is a public high school in Coshocton, Ohio. The school primarily serves students residing in the Coshocton City School District. The school district also participates in open enrollment making it possible for students from outside district boundaries to enroll at Coshocton High School. The school currently has an enrollment of approximately 700 students in grades 7-12.

Sports

Coshocton High School is a member of the East Central Ohio League. Sports competed in include; swimming, football, soccer, baseball, basketball, softball, volleyball, golf, track, wrestling, and tennis.

State championships

 Boys golf – 1970, 1975, 1982
 Baseball – 1978

See also
Native American mascot controversy
Sports teams named Redskins

External links
 State Report Card

Notes and references

High schools in Coshocton County, Ohio
Public high schools in Ohio
High School